Zhou Huang (1714–1785), also spelled Chou Huang or Chow Hwang, was a politician, writer and calligrapher of the Qing dynasty.

Zhou was a native of Fuzhou, Sichuan Province (present-day Fuling District, Chongqing). In 1737, he became a jinshi of the Imperial examination. He had served as editor of the Hanlin Academy (翰林院編修), Secretary of Cabinet (內閣學士), Minister of Works, Ministry of War, and Left Censor-in-Chief (左都御史). He also took part in compiling the famous Siku Quanshu. Zhou died in 1785 in his hometown and was posthumously granted the honorary appointment of Crown Prince's Grand Tutor (太子太傅). He was also awarded the posthumous name "Wengong" (文恭).

Zhou was good at poetry and calligraphy, he was also a tutor of Prince Yongyan (later the Jiaqing Emperor). In 1756 he was sent to Ryukyu Kingdom together with Quankui (全魁) for the investiture of Shō Boku. His boat caught in a storm and was wrecked on a reef near the Kume Island. Zhou prayed to Mazu for protection, his boat was finally arriving Naha Harbor safely. On his way home, Zhou and Quankui built a Mazu temple in Kume Island. Zhou also compiled Liuqiuguo Zhilüe (琉球國志略), a sixteen volume topography of the Ryukyu islands for the Qianlong Emperor.

References

1714 births
1785 deaths
18th-century Chinese writers
Qing dynasty politicians from Chongqing
Qing dynasty calligraphers
Qing dynasty writers
Writers from Chongqing
Imperial Chinese missions to the Ryukyu Kingdom